Joshua Clarke (born 19 May 1995) is an Australian track and field sprinter. He is a former national 100-metre champion in Australia.

Early life
Born in Sydney, Clarke studied at The King's School where he was coached by Nancy Atterton, a former sprinter and gold medalist in the 1954 British Empire and Commonwealth Games.

Career
Clarke started running at a young age, In December 2010, he set an Under-16 record with a time of 10.72 seconds in the 100m competing for NSW. He competed in the Australian Junior Athletics Championships in the 2012/13 season finishing 3rd overall behind Jarrod Geddes and Hugh Donovan with a time of 10.58 seconds.
He competed for Australia in the 2011 Commonwealth Youth Games where he competed in the 100m and the 4x 100metres events. He finished 3rd in the 100m final with a time of 10.53 seconds and he helped Australia finish 4th in the 4 × 100m relay.

He set a time of 10.36 seconds in the 2014 Junior Championships in Australia which puts him in 3rd place for the Australian Junior All-time list behind Matt Shirvington and Paul Narracott.

He also competed at the 2014 World Junior Championships and he finished 2nd in Heat 2 qualifying for the semi-finals with a time of 10.36 seconds but ran badly in the semis with a time of 10.79 seconds and not making the final.

In March 2015, he competed in the 93rd Australian Athletics Championships in Brisbane where he finished first in the 100m final with a time of 10.19 seconds just ahead of the Pacific Sprint-king, Banuve Tabakaucoro who ran 10.26 seconds.

Clarke won the 2016 ACT Athletics Championships  with a time of 10.15 seconds qualifying him for the 2016 Olympic Games. His run moved him from tenth to fifth on the Australian All Time list just behind Patrick Johnson (9.93), Matt Shirvington (10.03), Josh Ross (10.08) and Damien Marsh (10.13). It was the fastest time set by an Australian in the 100m in eight and a half years.

In February 2016, he became Australia's first male sprinter in the 100m at the Olympics since 2004 Athens Olympics after he ran a personal best of 10.15 seconds to qualify for the 2016 Olympics.

In May 2017, he moved to Canberra and is now coached by Matt Beckenham who also coaches the national record holder for the women's 100m, Melissa Breen.

Personal life
He is currently enrolled at The University of Sydney, working on a degree in commerce.

Statistics

Personal bests

References

External links
 
 Joshua Clarke at Athletics Australia
 Joshua Clarke at Australian Athletics Historical Results
 
 
 

1995 births
Living people
Athletes from Sydney
Australian male sprinters
Athletes (track and field) at the 2018 Commonwealth Games
Commonwealth Games competitors for Australia